Gilmore Girls is an American dramedy television series created by Amy Sherman-Palladino. Sherman-Palladino shares executive producer duties with David S Rosenthal, Gavin Polone, Daniel Palladino. It is produced by Dorothy Parker Drank Here Productions, Hofflund/Polone and Warner Bros. Television. The show follows single mother Lorelai Gilmore and her daughter Rory in the fictional town of Stars Hollow, Connecticut, a close-knit small town with many quirky characters, located roughly thirty minutes south of Hartford.

From 2000 to 2006, the first six seasons of Gilmore Girls originally aired on The WB, before it later merged with UPN to form The CW for its seventh and final season. All seven seasons are currently available on DVD in Regions 1, 2, and 4. Since the series premiered, it has averaged 5 million viewers per episode over its seven seasons. The series originally aired on Thursday nights 8/7c before Charmed in its first season. However, it was moved to Tuesday nights at 8/7c for the second season taking over Buffy the Vampire Slayer'''s old timeslot (UPN picked up Buffy from The WB) and held it for the rest of the series' run. The show placed No. 32 on Entertainment Weekly "New TV Classics" list, and in 2007 it was listed as one of Time magazine's "All-TIME 100 TV Shows." The show is known for its comedic fast dialogue. 

Over the course of seven seasons, Gilmore Girls aired a total of 153 episodes. It returned in 2016 for a limited miniseries A Year in the Life''. The revival consists of four 90-minute episodes released on Netflix.

Series overview

Episodes

Season 1 (2000–01)

Season 2 (2001–02)

Season 3 (2002–03)

Season 4 (2003–04)

Season 5 (2004–05)

Season 6 (2005–06)

Season 7 (2006–07)

Ratings

References

 
Lists of American comedy-drama television series episodes
Lists of American teen comedy television series episodes
Lists of American teen drama television series episodes